Xu Fu (Chinese: 徐富; born 2 November 1995 in Heilongjiang) is a Chinese male short track speed skater. He ranked 4th for men's 1000 meters in 2013 Winter Universiade in Trento, Italy.

References

External links
 

1995 births
Living people
Chinese male short track speed skaters
Universiade medalists in short track speed skating
Universiade gold medalists for China
Competitors at the 2015 Winter Universiade
Competitors at the 2017 Winter Universiade
Speed skaters at the 2022 Winter Olympics
Olympic speed skaters of China
21st-century Chinese people